Gibberula striata is a species of sea snail, a marine gastropod mollusk, in the family Cystiscidae.

References

striata
Gastropods described in 1957
Cystiscidae